St. John's Episcopal Church, in Clifton Springs, New York, is an Episcopal church founded in 1807. The parish is a member of the Episcopal Diocese of Rochester.

History 
The official founding date is 1807, when a piece of land was given to the Episcopal community in Clifton Springs by Mr. John Shekel.  A small, wooden structure was built in 1808, which became the First Episcopal Church of Clifton Springs.  The building served as the worship home for the Episcopal community until around 1820, when, due to dwindling numbers, the congregation sold the building to the local Methodist community.

The Episcopal community gathered to worship in one another's homes until 1841, when the group grew too large, and a new building project was begun.  The Second Episcopal Church of Clifton Springs was only in use for around 40 years, though, because in 1967, the current rector suggested a new edifice be built.

In 1879, the cornerstone was laid for the current St. John's structure. The building, made of Medina sandstone (from Medina, New York), was completed in 1883 and consecrated in 1884. In 2018, St. John's was inducted into the Medina Sandstone Hall of Fame, which judges structures "based on their age, longevity, beauty and architectural uniqueness."

In 1967, St. John’s in Clifton Springs, St. John's in Phelps, and Trinity Mission in Shortsville were merged into one parish – St. John’s in Clifton Springs. Today, the church serves the villages of Clifton Springs, Phelps, Shortsville, and Manchester.

List of clergy 

 Davenport Phelps, 1807-1813
 William A. Clark, 1811-1818
 Orin Clark, 1811-1816
 Alanson W. Welton, 1814-1821
 Henry Onderdonk, 1817-1820
 George Norton, 1818-1838
 Virgil H. Barber, 1818
 Erastus Spaulding, 1833-1854
 Kendrick Metcalf, 1855-1864
 William Gorham, 1858
 George Gillespie, 1860-1861
 Francis Russell, 1864-1866
 William Edson, 1866-1883
 George Le Boutillier, 1883-1886
 Lewis Clover, 1887-1890
 John Kinney, 1891-1893
 John Banchet, 1894-1897
 James Foster, 1898
 Alexander McDuff, 1898
 Frank Baum, 1989-1905
 Louis Johnston, 1906-1908
 Maskell Freeman, 1909-1916
 W. Guy Raines, 1918-1923
 Charles Purdy, 1924-1927
 Irving McGrew, 1927-1936
 Kenneth Frank Arnold, 1936-1938
 H. John Van Duyne, 1959-1963
 John J. Reinheimer, 1964-1971
 James C. Wood, 1971-1972
 Dustin P. Ordway, 1974-1977
 Jasper Pennington, 1978-1980
 Frank Howden, 1981-1993
 Cristine V. Rockwell, 1994-1998
 Thomas S. Gramley, 1999-2006
 Denise Bennett, 2007-2014
 Andrew VanBuren, 2015–2019
 Donald Schranz, 2020-present

References

External links 
 St. John's Episcopal Church Official Website
 Episcopal Diocese of Rochester

Episcopal church buildings in New York (state)
Churches in Ontario County, New York
1807 establishments in New York (state)
Churches completed in 1807
Religious organizations established in 1807